Chongqing Women's Prison is a prison in the municipality of Chongqing, China.

It contains about 2,000 inmates.

See also
List of prisons in Chongqing municipality

References

Year of establishment missing
Prisons in Chongqing
Women's prisons in China